Marco Boschini (1602–1681) was an Italian painter and engraver of the early Baroque period in Venice.

He was born in Venice, and was educated in the school of Palma il Giovane. He also distinguished himself as an engraver and as a writer on art. He was the author of several publications, such as: La Carta del Navegar pittoresco (1660), a panygeric poem about Venetian painting; Le minere della pittura veneziana (1664) and Le ricche minere della pittura veneziana (1674), two city guides of Venice; I gioieli pittoreschi. Virtuoso ornamento della città di Vicenza (1676), a city guide of Vicenza.

Boschini actually earned the most of his income as an art seller, working as an agent for (among others) cardinal Leopoldo de' Medici.
 Descrizione di tutte le pubbliche pitture della Città di Venezia e isole circonvicine o sia Rinnovazione delle Ricche Minere. by Marco Boschini. Presso Pietro Bassaglia, Venice. 1732.

The major Venetian painters for which he has brief biographies in his text, and arranged in general chronologic order, are:

References

 Wasmer, Marc-Joachim (2009), Marco Boschini, "Breve Instruzione". Eine stilkritische Einführung in "Le ricche minere della pittura veneziana". Italienisch-Deutsche Edition, 2 Bde., Diss. Universität Bern, 1994, Bern: Selbstverlag.

1613 births
1678 deaths
Artists from Venice
17th-century Italian painters
Italian male painters
Italian engravers
Italian Baroque painters
Italian art historians